La Vallee is a township in the Canadian province of Ontario, located within the Rainy River District. The township had a population of 938 in the Canada 2016 Census, down 5.1% from 2011.

Demographics 

See also
List of townships in Ontario

References

External links 

Municipalities in Rainy River District
Single-tier municipalities in Ontario
Township municipalities in Ontario